

z
Z-PAK

za

zabicipril (INN)
zabiciprilat (INN)
zabofloxacin (INN)
zacopride (INN)
Zaditen
Zaditor
zafirlukast (INN)
zafuleptine (INN)
Zagam
zalcitabine (INN)
zaldaride (INN)
zaleplon (INN)
zalospirone (INN)
zalutumumab (INN)
zaltidine (INN)
zaltoprofen (INN)
zamifenacin (INN)
Zanaflex
zanamivir (INN)
zankiren (INN)
zanolimumab (USAN)
Zanosar (Pharmacia & Upjohn Company)
zanoterone (INN)
Zantac (Johnson & Johnson)
Zantryl
zapizolam (INN)
zaprinast (INN)
Zapzyt (Waltman Pharmaceuticals)
zardaverine (INN)
Zarontin
Zaroxolyn
zatebradine (INN)
zatosetron (INN)
zaurategrast (INN)
Zavesca
Zaxopam

ze

Zebeta
Zefazone
Zegerid
Zelnorm
Zemaira
Zemplar
Zemuron
Zenapax
zenarestat (INN)
zeniplatin (INN)
zepastine (INN)
Zephiran
Zephrex
zeranol (INN)
Zerit
Zestoretic
Zestril
Zetacet
Zetar
Zetia
zetidoline (INN)
Zetran
Zevalin (Biogen Idec)

zi

Ziac
Ziagen (GlaxoSmithKline). Redirects to abacavir.
Ziba-Rx
zibotentan (USAN)
zibrofusidic acid (INN)
ziconotide (INN)
zicronapine (INN)
zidapamide (INN)
Zide
zidometacin (INN)
zidovudine (INN)
zifrosilone (INN)
Zilactin
zilantel (INN)
zilascorb (2 H) (INN)
zileuton (INN)
zilpaterol (INN)
zimeldine (INN)
zimidoben (INN)
Zinacef
zinapitant (INN)
Zincfrin
Zincofax
Zincon
zindotrine (INN)
zindoxifene (INN)
Zinecard (Pharmacia & Upjohn Company)
zinoconazole (INN)
zinostatin stimalamer (INN)
zinostatin (INN)
zinterol (INN)
zinviroxime (INN)
Zipan
zipeprol (INN)
ziprasidone (INN)
ziralimumab (INN)
Zithromax

zo

zocainone (INN)
Zocor
zofenopril (INN)
zofenoprilat (INN)
zoficonazole (INN)
Zofran
Zoladex (AstraZeneca)
zolamine (INN)
zolasartan (INN)
zolazepam (INN)
zoledronic acid (INN)
zolenzepine (INN)
zoleprodolol (INN)
zolertine (INN)
Zolicef
zolimidine (INN)
zolimomab aritox (INN)
zoliprofen (INN)
zolmitriptan (INN)
Zoloft (Pfizer)
zoloperone (INN)
zolpidem (INN)
Zolyse (Alcon)
zomebazam (INN)
zomepirac (INN)
Zometa (Novartis)
Zomig
Zonalon
zonampanel (USAN)
Zonegran
zoniclezole (INN)
zoniporide mesylate (USAN)
zonisamide (INN)
zopiclone (INN)
zopolrestat (INN)
Zorbtive
zorubicin (INN)
zosuquidar (INN)
zotarolimus (USAN)
Zostrix
zosuquidar (USAN)
Zosyn (Wyeth)
zotepine (INN)
Zovia
Zovirax
zoxazolamine (INN)

zu-zy

zucapsaicin (INN)
zuclomifene (INN)
zuclopenthixol (INN)
Zyban
Zyflo
zylofuramine (INN)
Zyloprim (GlaxoSmithKline)
Zymar
Zyprexa
Zyrtec
Zyvox